This is a list of airports in Liberia, sorted by location.



Airports 

Airport names shown in bold indicate the airport has scheduled service on commercial airlines.

See also 
 Transport in Liberia
 List of airports by ICAO code: G#GL - Liberia
 Wikipedia: WikiProject Aviation/Airline destination lists: Africa#Liberia

References 
 
  - includes IATA codes
 Great Circle Mapper: Liberia - IATA and ICAO codes
 World Aero Data: Liberia - ICAO codes

Liberia
 
Airports
Airports
Liberia